The University of the Philippines College Admission Test, commonly known as UPCAT, is part of the admission requirements of the University of the Philippines, administered to graduates of Philippine and foreign high schools.

UPCAT was first administered in 1968.

Eligibility and Application

To be considered eligible for the UPCAT, an applicant should be any of the following:
 A 12th-grade student of a secondary school that is accredited by the Department of Education;
 A graduate of any secondary school that is accredited by the Department of Education, or of any secondary school abroad; or
 An individual that has been declared eligible to enter college according to the Philippine Educational Placement Test (PEPT) results.

In addition, graduates must not have taken and must not be taking any college subjects. They should not plan to take any college subjects before the semester or academic year of the UPCAT.

The deadline for filing of applications for the UPCAT is announced regularly, and is usually from late July to early August.

The UPCAT can only be taken once by an applicant. Any applicant who has taken the examination is ineligible to take it again.

University Predicted Grade
The University Predicted Grade (UPG) is a combined score of an applicant's weighted UPCAT score (60%) and the weighted average of their grades in high school (40%). The admission test results are ranked according to the examinees' UPGs.

To make the student population of UP more representative of the country's population, socioeconomic and geographic factors are also considered in selecting campus qualifiers.

Qualifying for a Campus and a Degree Program
An applicant must specify two campuses, in order of preference, from among the U.P. System's nine campuses. For each campus chosen, two degree programs must also be specified (but applicants may select up to four). UPCAT applications are processed according to the order of these preferences.

The top-ranked applicants (according to the UPG) based on the quota and cut-off grade of each campus are eligible to enter. For degree programs, different grade predictors are applied for each. Top-ranked qualifiers are accepted depending on the slots available in that program.

If the applicants do not qualify for the two preferred campuses, they may request to be included in the wait list provided that they have stated the campus they would apply to as either their first or second choice.

If they are UPCAT qualifiers, they only need to find a degree program that will accept them. The campus Registrar’s Office will help them find that degree program. Qualification into UP is therefore a matter of qualifying for a campus, regardless of choices of degree programs.

Examination
The five-hour examination covers language proficiency, reading comprehension, mathematics, and science. UPCAT questions can be in English or Filipino. The exam is usually administered on a Saturday and Sunday in early August with two batches of examinations per day: one in the morning and the other in the afternoon.

UPCAT test centers are found in major schools throughout the Philippines, including the different UP campuses. Close to 100,000 applicants take the UPCAT every year with almost 40,000 in UP Diliman alone. Because of this, and that the campus is open and connected to major public roads, heavy traffic is expected at this time of year. Food stalls and other tiangges set up shop everywhere around the Diliman campus, especially the Academic Oval, to provide the needs of parents and guardians who accompany and wait for the applicants taking the test.

Admission Results
All UPCAT news and results are announced at the University's website, usually around January or February. The list of qualified applicants is also posted outside the U.P. Office of Admissions. Aside from these, a list of examinees and their corresponding qualifying status is sent to their respective high school. Finally, individual letters containing qualifying information and further instructions, if any, are sent to the individual examinees.

Around 10%-15% of the examinees pass the UPCAT and qualify for admission to the University every year. In 2016, in the first UPCAT conducted in the fully enforced K+12 system in the country, out of 10,000 applicants, only around 1,500 passed. The university has since seen applications for the UPCAT exceeding 100,000 annually since 2017, the first time that the first full K+12 system graduates have taken the examinations. In 2019, with the RA 10931 enforced, institutionalizing free tuition across state universities and colleges (SUCs) in the country, a record-high 90,426 applicants took the test. Of this, 11,821 were qualified for admission.

Since 2018, the UPCAT results can also be accessed through any WAP-enabled device (particularly PDAs and mobile phones), at the University's official WAP site. From 2019 onwards, in consideration with the country's Data Privacy Act, the viewing of results shifted to a new system, ending the era of public viewing via masterlist, with student applicants requested to log in using the email address and password used during the online application process.

In the late 2010s, UPCAT results are infamous for being released late relative to other major Philippines universities which have cost some parents upwards of ₱5,000.00 in reservation fees in other universities. This has also caused great anxiety to applicants because they only release a range of weeks or months that resulted to applicants checking every single day of that month or week.

Oblation Scholars
U.P. Oblation Scholars are the top 50 qualifiers to the UPCAT. Their scholarships, should they choose to enter UP, include a 100% discount on tuition fees, transportation and book allowances, and monthly stipends.

Among the Oblation Scholars who decide to enroll in UP, several are chosen to give a welcome address during the freshman assembly at the UP Theater.

References

External links
 UPCAT Online - UP Office of Admissions Online
 UPCAT Online Application
 Office of the University Registrar (OUR)
 Admissions and the UPCAT
 UPD Welcomes New Freshmen - from Diliman UPDate Online

University of the Philippines
Philippine college admissions tests